Sadiq Farhad is an Afghan cricketer. He made his List A debut for Mis Ainak Region in the 2017 Ghazi Amanullah Khan Regional One Day Tournament on 14 August 2017. He made his first-class debut for Band-e-Amir Region in the 2017–18 Ahmad Shah Abdali 4-day Tournament on 1 December 2017.

References

External links
 

Year of birth missing (living people)
Living people
Afghan cricketers
Band-e-Amir Dragons cricketers
Mis Ainak Knights cricketers
Place of birth missing (living people)